Greatest Hits: The Road Less Traveled is a 2005 compilation album by Melissa Etheridge, released by Island Records. It featured 17 tracks from her then-17-year career, five of which were newly recorded. Eight of the other 12 tracks were specially remixed for this compilation.

Commercial performance
The album peaked at #14 on the Billboard 200. With its release, Etheridge also released the single "Refugee", a cover of the Tom Petty song; it reached #96 on the Pop 100. Also released for radio was the new song "I Run for Life", written about her struggle with breast cancer. The song reached #80 on the Pop 100 and #10 on the Adult Contemporary charts.

The album was certified Gold in December 2005, for sales of over 500,000 copies. This was Etheridge's first Gold certification since Breakdown in 1999.

Track listing
All songs by Melissa Etheridge, except where noted

"Refugee" (Tom Petty, Mike Campbell) – 3:37 [new track]
"Similar Features" – 4:44 [remix]
"Like the Way I Do" – 5:25 [remix]
"Bring Me Some Water" – 3:54 [remix]
"You Can Sleep While I Drive" – 3:15 [remix]
"No Souvenirs" – 4:33 [remix]
"Ain't It Heavy" – 4:24 [remix]
"I'm the Only One" – 4:16 [single edit]
"Come to My Window" – 3:35 [single edit]
"If I Wanted To" – 3:55
"I Want to Come Over" – 5:24 [remix]
"Angels Would Fall" (Etheridge, John Shanks) – 4:39 [remix]
"Lucky" – 3:58
"Christmas in America" – 4:21 [new track]
"Piece of My Heart" (Bert Berns, Jerry Ragovoy) – 4:19 [new track]
"This Is Not Goodbye" – 3:37 [new track]
"I Run for Life" – 4:21 [new track]
"I Need to Wake Up" – 3:36 [new track, on re-release only]

Charts

Singles – Billboard (United States)

References

2005 greatest hits albums
Melissa Etheridge albums
Island Records compilation albums